is a Japanese manga series by Bungo Yamashita. It was serialized online via Cygames' Cycomi manga app and website from May 2016 to May 2021 and has been collected in fifteen tankōbon volumes by Kodansha (former) and Shogakukan (current). An anime television series adaptation by Studio Gokumi aired from January 7 to March 24, 2020.

Synopsis

Premise
Due to a population decline, there are fewer humans than there are humanoid animals. Jin Mazama is a human boy who attends Seton Academy where the majority of students are animals. Jin hates animals, but as luck would have it, a female human named Hitomi Hino catches his eye. Unfortunately, Jin finds himself grabbing the attention of other animals such as Ranka Ōkami, a wolf who is the only one in her pack.

Setting
In the world of Seton Academy, all the male students and staff have the appearance of their species, while the females all appear as various forms of moe girls with kemonomimi, and other features such as tails and/or horns.

Characters

Cooking Club

A male human who hates animals after an incident with Ranka and three bear cubs when they were children. He has a crush on Hitomi, the only other human at Seton Academy, although he may have taken a liking to Ranka. Like Hitomi, he enjoys cooking for himself as the academy's cafeteria mostly caters to animal diets. He is very knowledgeable about animals based on their instincts, weaknesses, and modern history. Aside from his stubbornness, Jin usually carries on helping Ranka and other animals. Overjoyed having to fleetingly register at a human school with Hitomi, Jin soon realized that he's not used to the human society and keeps getting into a perverted state of affairs, that he (unwilling) and Hitomi (missing her animal friends) decide to enroll back at Seton Academy. After being stampede by a herd of elephants, Jin woke up ten years later and found Ranka passed away; he used Miyubi's time-leaping device through 145 loops till he succeeds in avoiding this outcome. Jin genuinely approves Ranka and her pack at a graduation ceremony for third-years'. 

A pink female Hokkaido wolf. While she considers herself a pack leader, she treats Jin as the alpha male and becomes possessive and jealous when he is approached by other females. After overhearing Jin's confession to Hitomi, Ranka opts to become the next student council president as a means to escape. Accepting Jin's unexpected opposition in the election, she and Jin challenged each other through the school tower but Jin steps down when privately admitting his slight affection for her. Jin became such an important figure in Ranka's life that she would neglect her health for the sake of being with Jin.  

A female human who became friends with Jin as the few other humans at Seton. She enjoys cooking and decided to start a cooking club. She is easily embarrassed when watching Jin dealing with the animal habits of other girls. In the future, Hitomi became a nurse tending for a patient Jin, although this is unconfirmed if it's really her personal career path once Jin's impending fate has been altered. 

A female koala who has grown tired of only eating eucalyptus and joined the Cooking Club to expand her diet. She later meets a pig who is soon-to-be her boyfriend. In the future, Yukari opened her p**p café company that is franchise worldwide. 

A female three-toed sloth. Like a sloth, she moves extremely slowly and will pass out and die if she exerts herself. She has also been known to pass out (or "die") after taking a bath, eating unfamiliar foods, or walking more quickly than normal for more than a few yards. She has expressed an interest in identifying any sport she could take part in without dying and joined the Cooking Club in order to make friends. In the future, Miyubi became a vague scientist that really confuses Jin of her big vocabulary and professionalism.

A female cat who can elicit different feelings in others by altering the frequency of her purring. She joined the Cooking Club to make friends but is too proud to admit it. She is referred to as the club's "ghost member" as she rarely takes part in club activities but is sometimes seen around the club room and was instrumental in acquiring a steady supply of vegetables from the Gardening Club. In the future, Kurumi is suited to being a model. 

A female panda who has the popularity of a celebrity. She is quite a spoiled brat who's often self-centered, haughty, and lazy. However, during her visit to the academy, she stumbled on the Cooking Club where Jin and the rest of the members were making panda dumplings. Mei Mei then snatched every piece and ate them, sparking an interest in joining the club, but of course, Jin didn't make it easy for her because of her unruly behavior. She only became a member when Kurumi gave her approval in a way that a cat does and from then on Mei Mei slowly became more cooperative, nice, but a masochist. In the future, Mei-Mei is a producer of an idol agency.

The only vampire bat at Seton Academy who enrolled when the second-year began. Opposed to her nature, she is too scared to suck the blood out of livestock. She comes to the Cooking Club as there is salty or sour food that can satisfy her thirst, to Ranka's delight. Chii develops a natural attraction to Jin due to his unusual kindness to her. In the future, Chii runs her own drink bar compose of different types of blood. While only starring in the manga, she makes a cameo in the 11th episode of the anime. 
Hana
A female Rhinograde that originally came to Seton Academy but Jin unwittingly gave her amnesia. Since her species is supposed to have existed only in fiction she lacks any sense of odor that Ranka couldn't pick up, Miyubi calls it a miracle. Nicknamed Hana, she relies on Ranka's pack to care for her. During a soccer match, Hana and her brethren of the Southern island nearly disappear from the existence that Jin predicted, but Ranka and the female cast lick her entire body to stabilize her existence. Her real name is Hoji-Hoji. In the future, Hana found her talent of being a novelist.

A female woolly spider monkey. She acts as an advisor for the Cooking Club.

Supporting

A male Tyrannosaurus teacher. During the Cretaceous period, when Gigasu was a student at Mesozoic Academy he had a budding romance with a young Sameno but does not reciprocate them. 

A male Anomalocaris is the headmaster of Seton Academy.

A female Grévy's zebra mare who insists she is a noble species of horse and becomes embarrassed at any suggestion she is related to the donkey species. Her hobby is playing trading card games. After Ranka won the Field race, Chloe is given free space in the Cooking Club room and warms up to the others. A quagga once smitten Chloe to beat her in a game tournament until Jin exposed him. 

A male African lion with a large harem of female lions. Despite being surrounded by females of his own species he is in love with Shiho, a female impala. As a supporter of inter-species relationships, he gets along with Jin and the members of the cooking club. A running gag includes his once impressive mane falling out whenever something goes wrong with his relationship with Shiho. King and Shiho will apparently mate and breed cubs ten years later.

A female Naked mole-rat and Student Council President. She has an army of male naked mole-rats she considers her friends and who treat her as their queen. As a rule, she prefers being naked or partially clothed and considers having to be fully clothed at school deeply embarrassing. She is against the idea of mixed-species romance and considers it her duty to keep the students, particularly Jin, from dating outside their own species. With her presidential position expired she primarily resort to nudism again only to have gotten used to not being too revealing in public. Ten years later, Miki is the acting principal of Seton Academy.

A female impala. She was initially unaware that King had a crush on her but after he confessed she agreed to be his friend, at least until she begins her reproductive cycle and could decide if she is romantically attracted to him.

A female spotted hyena that thinks she's a male. Even after her real gender is proven, Hitomi reassures Iena to just be the tomboyish she wants. It is hinted on multiple occasions that Iena and Hitomi have mutual feelings for each other. In the future, Iena is a martial artist.

A female Hokkaido wolf. Ferrill is Ranka's older sister and the boss of her own pack. She is tall in size due to enduring cold climates throughout her life in the mountains.

A male Eastern wolf who is a member of Ferrill's pack.

A female honey badger that tries to fight Ranka & wants to join with Ferrill. Her thick skin makes her almost invulnerable and Ferrill is one of the only characters strong enough to inflict pain on her.

 
A female tarsier. Even a small amount of stress can be enough to compel her to bang her head on a hard surface in an attempt at suicide. Mei Mei makes friends with Manako. 

A male African lion is King's rival and he's a leader of his pride.

A male Iguanodon school doctor.

Sea Academy 

A female beluga whale who wants to perform in the seaside school show. She becomes a friend to Ranka and her pack.

A female bottlenose dolphin who is the captain of the synchronized Swimming Club. 

A male Opabinia is a headmaster of Sea Academy.

Darwin Academy 

A female neanderthal who eats very large amounts of meat as her species have twice that of modern humans' appetite. Because she has no obvious animal traits, the other characters mistake her for a human. Anne is part of Team EX that is rebellious against humans. While visiting Seton Academy, Jin mistakes her advances towards him as romance and "turns her down," to her disgrace. Anne means to interfere with Ranka's pack. After learning humans inherit 2% of neanderthal genomes, Anne makes peace with the Cooking Club and evens wants Hitomi as her mate.

A female woolly mammoth. She's the boss of Team EX. Her friendship with Anne was promptly by the fact they are extinct species (because of humans theoretically). In the anime, Man's stern behavior towards humans got out of hand when she brutally beats up Ranka in a boxing match that Anne threatens to end their pact if not resolve otherwise. She and other Darwin students later have supper with the Cooking Club.

A male Steller sea cow that is a member of Team EX.

A male Barbary lion that is a member of Team EX.

A male Andrewsarchus that is a member of Team EX.

A female Chinese river dolphin that is a member of Team EX.

A female Carcharodontosaurus teacher. For millions of years, Sameno was hopelessly waiting for Gigasu would admit his love to her. That is until Ferrill transfers and professes this in front of Sameno to her embarrassment.

Media

Manga
The series is written and illustrated by Bungo Yamashita. It began serialization in Cygames's Cycomi website in May 2016.

Seton Academy: Join the Pack!

Murenase! Seton Gakuen -Animal Academy-

Anime
On October 4, 2019, an anime television series adaptation was announced by Cygames. The series was animated by Studio Gokumi and directed by Hiroshi Ikehata, with Shigeru Murakoshi handling series composition, and Masakatsu Sasaki designing the characters. Yōsuke Yamashita, Yusuke Katō, and Tomoya Kawasaki composed the series' music. It aired from January 7 to March 24, 2020 on Tokyo MX, SUN, KBS, BS11, and Animax. Crunchyroll streamed the series outside Asian territories. In Southeast Asia and South Asia, Medialink streamed the series on its Ani-One YouTube channel. It ran for 12 episodes, with an unaired episode to be bundled with the series' third Blu-ray volume.

Notes

References

External links
  
 

2020 anime television series debuts
2020s Japanese LGBT-related television series
Animated television series about animals
Anime series based on manga
Crunchyroll anime
Cygames franchises
Japanese LGBT-related animated television series
Japanese webcomics
Kodansha manga
Medialink
Romantic comedy anime and manga
School life in anime and manga
Shogakukan manga
Shōnen manga
Studio Gokumi
Tokyo MX original programming
Webcomics in print